Kurt Arnold Raaflaub (born 15 February 1941, Buea, Cameroon) is a Swiss historian and Emeritus Professor of Classics and History at Brown University, where he taught Greek and Roman history. He is the brother of conductor Beat Raaflaub.

Raaflaub was born to Fritz Raaflaub and Heidi Ninck in 1941 in Cameroon where his father worked as a teacher and missionary. Returned to his Swiss home town Basel, he graduated at the University of Basel in 1970 and has been employed at the Freie Universität Berlin, Germany. In 1978 he became a professor at Brown University in Providence, Rhode Island, remaining in this position until his retirement in 2009. Raaflaub is married to Deborah Boedeker; they co-directed the Center for Hellenic Studies in Washington, D.C.

In 2004, Kurt Raaflaub received the James Henry Breasted Prize, from the American Historical Association, for his book, The Discovery of Freedom in Ancient Greece, published earlier that year.

References

External links 
 Biography at Brown University's Researchers@Brown site

Living people
Brown University faculty
1941 births